The dolmens of Abkhazia are found in several locations in Abkhazia/Georgia. A dolmen is a type of pre-historic single-chamber megalithic tomb. These structures are located in the north of Abkhazia, best studied being those at Eshera. Similar structures are found in the neighboring territory of Northwestern Caucasus.

Description
The dolmens in Abkhazia seem to have been family burials, earliest of which were constructed in the 3rd millennium BC and the largest of which date to the Middle Bronze Age, probably the first half of the 1st millennium BC. They consist of four massive flat stones set vertically and roofed with the fifth similar stone. Some of the dolmens have a stone slab as the floor. An oval aperture of around 0.4 m diameter is often found on the lateral walls and floor slabs. Large stones are edged around the exterior walls. Archaeological artifacts found in the dolmens include axes, spear tips, various headpieces, and pottery.

Current condition
The current state of condition of Abkhazia's dolmens is not known. Georgia has inscribed the dolmens of Abkhazia on its list of cultural heritage and reported a threat of destruction due to the lack of adequate conservation. The dolmens of Abkhazia are also exhibited at the Georgian National Museum in Tbilisi and the State Museum in Sukhumi.

References 

Prehistoric Georgia (country)
History of Abkhazia
Buildings and structures in Abkhazia